Yusuph Abdallah Nassir (born 25 April 1965) is a Tanzanian CCM politician and Member of Parliament for Korogwe Town  constituency since 2010.

References

1965 births
Living people
Chama Cha Mapinduzi MPs
Tanzanian MPs 2010–2015
Magamba Secondary School alumni
Mzumbe University alumni
Tanzanian schoolteachers